The Greenville Spinners was a primary name of the minor league baseball teams located in Greenville, South Carolina between 1907 and 1962. Greenville teams played as members of the South Carolina League in 1907,  Carolina Association (1908–1912), the South Atlantic League (1919–1930, 1946–1950 and 1961–1962), the Palmetto League in 1931, and the Tri-State League (1954–1955).

Greenville was an affiliate of the Washington Senators (1939–1941), Chicago White Sox (1946), Brooklyn Dodgers (1947–1950) and Los Angeles Dodgers (1961–1962).

Baseball Hall of Fame member Tommy Lasorda (1949) and Greenville native Shoeless Joe Jackson (1908).

Greenville Spinners
A native of the Greenville, South Carolina area, Shoeless Joe Jackson played for the 1908 Greenville Spinners. Jackson hit .346 to lead the Carolina Association, while earning a salary of $75.00 a month. In August, 1908, Jackson's contract was purchased by the Connie Mack of the Philadelphia Athletics for $900.00. Jackson immediately reported to the Athletics and made his major league debut. Today, there is a museum and numerous locales honoring Jackson in Greenville.

Tommy Lasorda pitched for the Greenville Spinners in 1949 at age 21. Lasorda compiled a 7-7 record and a 2.93 ERA with 138 walks and 158 strikeouts in 178 innings for the Brooklyn Dodgers affiliate.

Notable alumni

Baseball Hall of Fame alumni

 Tommy Lasorda (1949) Inducted, 1997

Notable alumni
 Rocky Bridges (1948) MLB All-Star
 Como Cotelle (1940)
 Oscar Grimes (1950) MLB All-Star
 Clem Labine (1947) 2 x MLB All-Star
 Pepper Martin (1947) 4 x MLB All-Star
 Ray Moore (1948)
 Sherry Robertson (1941)
Mickey Vernon (1938) 7 x MLB All Star; 2 x NL Batting Title (1946, 1953)
 Dixie Walker (1930) 5 x MLB All-Star; 1944 NL Batting Title
 Harry Walker (1938) 2 x MLB All-Star; 1947 NL Batting Title
 Tillie Walker (1928–1929) 1918 Al Home Run Leader

See also
Greenville Spinners players

References

External links
Baseball Reference

Defunct minor league baseball teams
Brooklyn Dodgers minor league affiliates
Washington Senators minor league affiliates
Chicago White Sox minor league affiliates
Defunct Western Carolinas League teams
Baseball in Greenville, South Carolina
Professional baseball teams in South Carolina
1907 establishments in South Carolina
1962 disestablishments in South Carolina
Baseball teams established in 1907
Baseball teams disestablished in 1962
South Atlantic League (1904–1963) teams
Defunct baseball teams in South Carolina
Defunct Tri-State League teams
Palmetto League teams
Carolina Association teams